The 1993 Topper South American Open Tennis Championships was an Association of Tennis Professionals men's tennis tournament played on outdoor clay courts at the Buenos Aires Lawn Tennis Club in Buenos Aires, Argentina. It was the 22nd edition of the tournament and was held from 8 November though 15 November 1993. Second-seeded Carlos Costa won the singles title.

Finals

Singles

 Carlos Costa defeated  Alberto Berasategui 3–6, 6–1, 6–4
 It was Costa's 3rd title of the year and the 9th of his career.

Doubles

 Tomás Carbonell /  Carlos Costa defeated  Sergio Casal /  Emilio Sánchez 6–4, 6–4
 It was Carbonell's 3rd title of the year and the 12th of his career. It was Costa's 2nd title of the year and the 8th of his career.

References

External links 
 Association of Tennis Professionals (ATP) tournament profile

 
Topper South American Open Tennis Championships
ATP Buenos Aires
November 1993 sports events in South America